The 2013 Houston Texans season was the franchise's 12th season in the National Football League. The Texans failed to improve upon their 12–4 record from 2012, suffering through a season-ending 14-game losing streak following a 2–0 start and missing the playoffs for the first time since 2010. Head coach Gary Kubiak was fired after eight seasons following their eleventh loss (Week 14 vs. the Jacksonville Jaguars). Defensive coordinator Wade Phillips was named the interim head coach for the final three games of the season. Their 14-game losing streak is the worst in team history. Coming off a franchise-best 12–4 record just the year before, the Texans tie a league record with the Houston Oilers (who, coincidentally, also went 12–4 in 1993 and 2–14 in 1994) for the biggest season-to-season decline in win total. On January 3, 2014, claiming that "I'm ready to kick 2013 the hell out the door", Texans owner Robert McNair announced that former Penn State head coach Bill O'Brien would be the Texans' third head coach.

2013 draft class

 

Draft trades
 The Texans traded their fifth-round selection (No. 160 overall) to the St. Louis Rams in exchange for two sixth-round selections from the Rams – Nos. 184 and 198 overall. The Texans later traded the No. 184 selection along with their seventh-round selection (No. 233 overall) to the Oakland Raiders in exchange for the Raiders' sixth-round selection (No. 176 overall).

Staff

Final roster

Schedule

Preseason

Regular season

Note: Intra-division opponents are in bold text.

Game summaries

Week 1: at San Diego Chargers

The Texans won their fourth straight regular season opener and picked up their first franchise victory against the San Diego Chargers, improving to 1–4 against them on the late game of ESPN's Week 1 Monday Night Football doubleheader. San Diego scored 4 times compared to Houston's 1 to take a 28-7 3rd quarter lead before Houston scored 24 straight points to win 31-28.

Week 2: vs. Tennessee Titans

With the OT win, the Texans improved to 2-0 for the 4th straight year. In a hard fought defensive battle, Tennessee built up a lead as big as 24-16 before Houston sent it to overtime behind Arian Foster's TD run and 2-point conversion with 1:53 to go in regulation. DeAndre Hopkins caught his first career touchdown, which was the game-winning touchdown to give the Texans the 30-24 win. If not for this overtime victory, the 2013 Texans would've became the first team since the 2001 Carolina Panthers to win their opener and lose the remainder of their games.

Week 3: at Baltimore Ravens

The Texans' 14-game losing streak started in Baltimore, where the Ravens pummeled Houston, 30-9. The Texans fell to 2-1. After Houston grabbed a 6-3 lead, the Ravens got a pick-six and a punt return for a touchdown to make it 17-6. Baltimore outscored Houston in the second half 13-3 en route to a 30-9 win.

Week 4: vs. Seattle Seahawks

After falling behind 3-0 at the end of the first quarter, the Texans scored 20 unanswered to build up a 20-3 halftime lead. But with a 20-6 fourth quarter lead, Houston gave up two touchdowns, including a pick-six by Richard Sherman to tie the game at 20. The Seahawks won in overtime 23-20 on Steven Hauschka's 45-yard field goal with 3:23 to go in OT. With the surprising loss, the Texans fell to 2-2.

Week 5: at San Francisco 49ers

Matt Schaub threw another pick-six in a blowout loss to the 49ers. The final was 34-3 and the Texans fell to 2-3.

Week 6: vs. St. Louis Rams

St. Louis had 2 straight defensive touchdowns and they dominated Houston 38-13. Houston dropped to 2-4.

Week 7: at Kansas City Chiefs

Case Keenum got the start in a game that ended with Houston losing 17-16 to Kansas City. They would drop to 2-5.

Week 9: vs. Indianapolis Colts
Battle Red Day

Houston got off to a 21-3 lead, but Indy outscored them 24-3 to win 27-24. Houston dropped to 2-6. At halftime, head coach Gary Kubiak collapsed on the field on his way to the locker room with a Transient Ischemic Attack. Defensive coordinator Wade Phillips took over head coaching duties for the remainder of the game.

Week 10: at Arizona Cardinals

Arizona dominated the second half in a 27-24 win. Houston dropped to 2-7

Week 11: vs. Oakland Raiders

Week 12: vs. Jacksonville Jaguars

Week 13: vs. New England Patriots

The Texans had a lead as much as 17-7 at the half, but fell 34-31 to the Patriots to match their combined number of losses from the previous two seasons (10).

Week 14: at Jacksonville Jaguars

With the Texans dropping to 2-11, Houston was swept by the Jaguars for the first time since 2009.

Week 15: at Indianapolis Colts

Week 16: vs. Denver Broncos

Week 17: at Tennessee Titans

With the loss to Tennessee, Houston lost 14 straight games to close out a disappointing season.

The Texans 14 game losing streak has matched the 1980 Saints and the 1976 Buccaneers.

Standings

Division

Conference

Statistics

Team

Individual

Source:

References

External links
 
 2013 Houston Texans season at ESPN

Houston
Houston Texans seasons